The Rainbow Landscape is a 1640 oil-on-panel painting by Peter Paul Rubens, now in the Alte Pinakothek in Munich. One of the painter's last works and the third of three autograph works on the same subject, it mixes Italian and Flemish influences in a style reminiscent of Rubens' friend Jan Bruegel the Elder but with figures drawing on nymphs from the work of Annibale Carracci and Domenichino.

References

Paintings by Peter Paul Rubens
Landscape paintings
1640 paintings
Collection of the Alte Pinakothek
Rainbows in art
Birds in art
Horses in art
Cattle in art